Timothy Charles Plunket Whidborne (1927-2021) was a British artist notable for his 1969 portrait of Queen Elizabeth II on horseback as Colonel-in-Chief of the Irish Guards, of which Whidborne had once been a member.

Whidborne was born at High Wycombe and educated at Stowe School where he was a contemporary of George Melly.  He served as a lieutenant in the Irish Guards and saw service in Mandatory Palestine. In 1949 he became a pupil of Pietro Annigoni. He exhibited at the Royal Academy in 1954 and in 1966 The Connoisseur described him as at "the forefront of mural decorators in England".

In 1983, Whidborne was one of the artists chosen to prepare alternative designs to the long-running Machin series of British definitive postage stamps. After consideration, the design was not changed and it was subsequently decided to continue with the current design for the lifetime of the Queen.

Selected publications
Pietro Annigoni: Il Periodo Inglese, 1949-1971. Leonardo-De Luca, Rome, 1991. Edited by Luciano Pelizzari, contribution by Timothy Whidborne. 
Woolly the Mammoth. Pheasantry Studios, London, 1993. 
Aspects of Deal. Pheasantry Studios, London, 2002. 
Aspects of Ireland. Pheasantry Studios, London, 2003. 
Aspects Abroad. Pheasantry Studios, London, 2005.  (new edition)
Aspects Diverse. Pheasantry Studios, London, 2008. 
A Cabinet of Curiosities. Pheasantry Studios, London, 2008. 
Aspects of Love and Passion. Pheasantry Studios, London, 2008. 
Aspects of Psychology. Pheasantry Studios, London, 2010. 
Aspects of Art and Ancestry. Grosvenor House, Tolworth, 2019. 
Images: Paintings and Drawings by Timothy Charles Plunket Whidborne. Grosvenor House, Tolworth, 2020.

References

1927 births
British artists
British muralists
People educated at Stowe School
Irish Guards officers
2021 deaths
People from High Wycombe